Boxberg is a town in the Main-Tauber district, in Baden-Württemberg, Germany. It is situated 16 km south of Tauberbischofsheim.

Villages
former independent villages that are part of Boxberg municipality since the 1970s:
Angeltürn, Bobstadt, Epplingen, Kupprichhausen, Lengenrieden, Oberschüpf, Schwabhausen, Schweigern, Uiffingen, Unterschüpf, Windischbuch and Wölchingen.

References

Main-Tauber-Kreis
Baden